The 2016 Chicago Eagles season was the team's first season and first as a member of Champions Indoor Football (CIF). The Eagles were one of 12 teams in the CIF for the 2016 season, they played in the 6-team Northern Division.

The Eagles played their home games at the UIC Pavilion in Chicago, Illinois, under the direction of head coach Tim Arvanitis.

Schedule
Key:

Regular season

Standings

Roster

References

Chicago Eagles
2010s in Chicago
2016 in Illinois
Chicago Eagles